Club Atlético Rentistas, known simply as Rentistas is a Uruguayan professional football club based in Cerrito de la Victoria, Montevideo. Founded in 1933, the club competes in the Uruguayan Segunda División.

History

In 1971, Rentistas was the first team of the neighbourhood (barrio) Cerrito de la Victoria that achieved promotion to the Uruguayan first division. They remained there until 1980. Rentistas returned to the first division on three other occasions (1989–92, 1997–01, 2004–07).

In 1998 Rentistas inaugurated their new stadium, Complejo Rentistas. The club finished second in the Clausura and qualified for the CONMEBOL Cup 1999.

Controversies
Rentistas is known for their involvement in third-party ownership. The transfer fee of Hulk was channeled through the club.

Rivalries
The neighbourhood has two sports clubs, who share a large rivalry; the Clásico del Cerrito is contested with CS Cerrito.

Current squad

Other players under

Managers
 Geordy Sequeiros
 Manuel Keosseian
 Martín Lasarte (1998–99)
 Carlos Manta (1 Jan 2005 – 18 September 2006)
 Álvaro Gutiérrez (2006–07)
  Julio César Balerio (18 September 2006 – 1 June 2007), (28 July 2011 – 7 November 2011)
 Edgardo Arias (8 Nov 2011 – 30 June 2012)
 Adolfo Barán (16 July 2012–Dec 14)
 Manuel Keosseián (Jan 2015–June 2015)
 Valentín Villazán (June 2015–)

Titles
 Primera División Apertura phase: 2020 AperturaSegunda División Uruguay: 4 1971, 1988, 1996, 2011

 Divisional Intermedia: 1'''
 1966

References

External links

 

 
Rentistas
Rentistas
Rentistas
1933 establishments in Uruguay